The vice president of Chad was a political position in Chad from 1975 to 1982 and from 1990 to 1991.

There were no provisions defined for succession during the regime of Hissène Habré until 1989. According to the current Constitution of Chad, the president of the National Assembly is the successor of President of Chad in case of a vacancy.

List of vice presidents of Chad

See also
 Politics of Chad
 List of heads of state of Chad
 List of prime ministers of Mali

References

Politics of Chad
Government of Chad
Chad
Vice presidents of Chad